The Canal de la Haute-Seine is an abandoned canal in central France. It used to connect the navigable Seine at Marcilly-sur-Seine to Troyes. It was constructed between 1808 and 1846. It was closed for navigation in 1957.

See also
List of canals in France

References

Seine
Canals opened in 1846
Former or disused inland waterways